The 1979 Venezuelan motorcycle Grand Prix, the first of 13 rounds of the F.I.M. 1979 Grand Prix motorcycle racing season, was held on 18 March at the San Carlos Circuit. British rider Barry Sheene, world champion in 1976 and 1977,  won the 500cc GP  by 18 seconds from Italian Virginio Ferrari to make it three successive Venezuelan GPs. Venezuelan racer Carlos Lavado won the 350cc class from Italian Walter Villa and Frenchman Patrick Fernandez.

Villa won the 250cc event, ahead of South African rider Kork Ballington by 20 seconds, marking the final Grand Prix victory of Villa's motorcycle racing career. Spanish rider Ángel Nieto won the 125cc class from Frenchman Thierry Espié and Italian Maurizio Massimiani. Nieto would later win the 125cc season championship. Yamaha won two races, and Suzuki and Minarelli one each.

Classifications

500 cc

350 cc

250 cc

125 cc

References

Venezuelan motorcycle Grand Prix
Venezuelan
Motorcycle Grand Prix